Bovis may refer to:
 Bovis Homes Group, a national British housebuilding company
 Bovis Lend Lease, an international construction management company and subsidiary of Lend Lease Corporation
 Bovis Project Management, an national Mexican construction management company, formerly subsidiary of Lend Lease Corporation

Biology

 Sarcoptes scabiei var. bovis, a mite subspecies

Other
 Calculus bovis, niu-huang or ox bezoars, dried gallstones of cattle used in Chinese herbology where they are said to remove toxins from the body
 Julian Bovis, a British journalist and award-winning art director